Agonopterix neoxesta is a moth in the family Depressariidae. It was described by Edward Meyrick in 1918. It is found in South Africa.

References

Endemic moths of South Africa
Moths described in 1918
Agonopterix
Moths of Africa